The 1941 Wilmington Clippers season was their fifth season in existence and their third in the American Association. Their official record was 4-3-2 but their record with exhibition games was 7-3-2. They made the playoffs and won the championship 21–13 against the Long Island Indians. Their head coach was George Veneroso.

Schedule 
Home games on November 23 against the Hartford Blues and the New York Yankees were cancelled.

Playoffs
The Clippers made the playoffs and beat the Paterson Panthers 33–0. Then they beat the Long Island Indians 21–13 in the championship. The championship game is in Bold.

References 

Wilmington Clippers
Wilmington Clippers
Wilmington Clippers seasons